= Seven Parks, Lexington =

Neighborhood in Lexington, Kentucky

Coordinates: 38.022°N 84.515°W

Seven Parks is a neighborhood in southwestern Lexington, Kentucky, United States. Its boundaries are Nicholasville Road to the east, Norfolk Southern railroad tracks to the west, Dantzler Drive to the north, and Arcadia Park Drive to the south.

Neighborhood statistics

- Area: 0.120 square miles (0.31 km^{2})
- Population: 467
- Population density: 3,897 per square mile (1,505/km^{2})
- Median household income: $44,328
